The following television stations operate on virtual channel 16 in the United States:

 K02RI-D in Cedar City Canyon, Utah
 K03IJ-D in College Station, Texas
 K07ZE-D in Rural Juab, etc., Utah
 K10QR-D in Leamington, Utah
 K15LW-D in Utahn, Utah
 K15MY-D in Caputa, South Dakota
 K16AB-D in Guymon, Oklahoma
 K16BQ-D in Brainerd, Minnesota
 K16CG-D in St. James, Minnesota
 K16CT-D in Cortez, etc., Colorado
 K16DS-D in St. George, Utah
 K16FC-D in San Luis Obispo, California
 K16GZ-D in Durango, Colorado
 K16IW-D in Redding, California
 K16JJ-D in Eureka, California
 K16KA-D in Pueblo, Colorado
 K16KI-D in Bend, Oregon
 K16KM-D in Bemidji, Minnesota
 K16NN-D in Laredo, Texas
 K16NQ-D in Pocatello, Idaho
 K17MH-D in Cedar Falls, Iowa
 K18GX-D in Juab, Utah
 K18IV-D in Mount Pleasant, Utah
 K18NN-D in Globe, Arizona
 K19LU-D in Cedar City, Utah
 K19MF-D in East Carbon County, Utah
 K20KF-D in Davenport, Iowa
 K21JS-D in Harrison, Arkansas
 K21KF-D in Frost, Minnesota
 K21KL-D in Rural Beaver County, Utah
 K22MV-D in Teasdale, Utah
 K23JV-D in Green River, Utah
 K23NU-D in Richfield, etc., Utah
 K23OD-D in Scipio, Utah
 K25PH-D in Roosevelt, Utah
 K25PM-D in Helper, Utah
 K26NE-D in Florence, Oregon
 K26NN-D in Bridger, etc., Montana
 K26OA-D in Parowan/Enoch/Paragonah, Utah
 K26OI-D in East Price, Utah
 K26OY-D in Malad City, Idaho
 K28KQ-D in Ferron, Utah
 K28KR-D in Huntington, Utah
 K28PH-D in Duchesne, Utah
 K28PN-D in Green River, Utah
 K28PR-D in Castle Dale, Utah
 K29IW-D in Clear Creek, Utah
 K30KJ-D in Manti & Ephrain, Utah
 K30KQ-D in Jackson, Minnesota
 K30PK-D in Kanarraville, etc., Utah
 K31AE-D in Sutherlin, Oregon
 K31LA-D in Fremont, Utah
 K33KF-D in Kanarraville, etc., Utah
 K33KI-D in Spring Glen, Utah
 K33OU-D in Fountain Green, Utah
 K35JH-D in London Springs, Oregon
 K35JI-D in Orangeville, Utah
 K35NV-D in Beryl/Newcastle/Modena, Utah
 K35NW-D in Beaver etc., Utah
 K35NX-D in Fillmore, etc., Utah
 K41LF-D in Salina & Redmond, Utah
 K48KC-D in Cottage Grove, Oregon
 K50CT-D in Cottage Grove, Oregon
 KADT-LD in Austin, Texas
 KAJL-LD in Fayetteville, Arkansas
 KBGS-TV in Billings, Montana
 KCGE-DT in Crookston, Minnesota
 KDSD-TV in Aberdeen, South Dakota
 KDSO-LD in Medford, Oregon
 KDTL-LD in St. Louis, Missouri
 KEDT in Corpus Christi, Texas
 KEMS in Vernal, Utah
 KGSA-LD in San Antonio, Texas
 KHSC-LD in Fresno, California
 KIVY-LD in Crockett, Texas
 KJJC-TV in Great Falls, Montana
 KKIC-LD in Boise, Idaho
 KKTQ-LD in Cheyenne, Wyoming
 KLRT-TV in Little Rock, Arkansas
 KMRZ-LD in Pomona, California
 KMTR in Eugene, Oregon
 KONG in Everett, Washington
 KORS-CD in Portland, Oregon
 KPTB-DT in Lubbock, Texas
 KSCZ-LD in San Jose-San Francisco, California
 KSNF in Joplin, Missouri
 KSXE-LD in Sioux City, Iowa
 KTAJ-TV in St. Joseph, Missouri
 KUNP in La Grande, Oregon
 KUPT-LD in Albuquerque, New Mexico
 KUPX-TV in Provo, Utah
 KVAD-LD in Amarillo, Texas
 KVAW in Eagle Pass, Texas
 KZDN-LD in Denver, Colorado
 W07DC-D in Allentown/Bethlehem, Pennsylvania
 W10CP-D in Towanda, Pennsylvania
 W14CO-D in Clarks Summit, etc., Pennsylvania
 W15CO-D in Towanda, Pennsylvania
 W16CC-D in West Gate, Florida
 W16CL-D in Key West, Florida
 W16CW-D in Villalba, Puerto Rico
 W16CX-D in Panama City, Florida
 W16DN-D in Traverse City, Michigan
 W16EE-D in Augusta, Georgia
 W16EJ-D in Harrisburg, Pennsylvania
 W16EK-D in Lenox, Georgia
 W16EL-D in Augusta, Georgia
 W20AD-D in Williamsport, Pennsylvania
 W25ER-D in Vero Beach, Florida
 W25FI-D in Maplewood, Ohio
 W26CV-D in Mansfield, Pennsylvania
 W29FQ-D in Pottsville, Pennsylvania
 W33DN-D in Florence, South Carolina
 WANA-LD in Naples, Florida
 WAPT in Jackson, Mississippi
 WBOC-TV in Salisbury, Maryland
 WCEE-LD in Charlotte, North Carolina
 WCQA-LD in Springfield, Illinois
 WCUH-LD in Fort Wayne, Indiana
 WDRH-LD in Raleigh, North Carolina
 WGGS-TV in Greenville, South Carolina
 WGPX-TV in Burlington, North Carolina
 WHMR-LD in Homestead, Florida
 WINP-TV in Pittsburgh, Pennsylvania
 WJKT in Jackson, Tennessee
 WJWJ-TV in Beaufort, South Carolina
 WJYL-CD in Jeffersonville, Indiana
 WKBJ-LD in Live Oak, Florida
 WNCB-LD in Fayetteville, North Carolina
 WNDU-TV in South Bend, Indiana
 WNEP-TV in Scranton, Pennsylvania
 WPBI-LD in Lafayette, Indiana
 WPBS-TV in Watertown, New York
 WPTD in Dayton, Ohio
 WQHI-LD in Myrtle Beach, South Carolina
 WTJR in Quincy, Illinois
 WUSI-TV in Olney, Illinois
 WUSV-LD in Clarksburg, West Virginia
 WVAW-LD in Charlottesville, Virginia
 WWPI-LD in Presque Isle, Maine
 WYBU-CD in Columbus, Georgia
 WYGA-CD in Atlanta, Georgia
 WZTS-LD in Hinton, West Virginia

The following television stations, which are no longer licensed, formerly operated on virtual channel 16 in the United States:
 K16JC-D in Beaumont, Texas
 KIMD-LD in Lufkin, Texas
 W16CV-D in Parkersburg, West Virginia
 W19EB-D in Lumberton, Mississippi
 W36BE-D in State College, Pennsylvania
 WCYD-LD in Myrtle Beach, South Carolina
 WKMH-LD in Peoria, Illinois

References

16 virtual